This article lists all power stations in Chad.

Thermal

See also 
 List of power stations in Africa
 List of largest power stations in the world
 Energy in Chad

References 

Chad
Power stations